Senator Dolan may refer to:

Chester A. Dolan Jr. (1907–1994), Massachusetts State Senate
John Dolan (politician) (born 1956), Senate of Ireland
Jonathan Dolan (born 1967), Missouri State Senate
Matt Dolan (born 1965), Ohio State Senate
Séamus Dolan (1914–2010), Senate of Ireland